Choqa Balk-e Alireza (also Romanized as Choqā Balk-e ‘Alīreẕā) is a village in Chaqa Narges Rural District, Mahidasht District, Kermanshah County, Kermanshah Province, Iran. At the 2006 census, its population was 257, in 56 families.

References 

Populated places in Kermanshah County